Ivan Chuchko (1889-1919) was a military commander in the Revolutionary Insurgent Army of Ukraine.

Biography
Ivan Chuchko was born into a peasant family in Huliaipole and received no education. As a teenager, he became enlisted into the Imperial Russian Army and took part in the World War I.

In 1918 he joined the Makhnovists, with which he commanded an artillery battery. According to his own political views he was a communist, but according to other sources he was non-partisan.

In February 1919, he took part in the Congress of representatives from peasant and workers' councils, sub-departments, headquarters and front-line soldiers, which was held in Huliaipole. At this congress, Ivan was elected a member of the Military Revolutionary Council of the RIAU. In 1919 he commanded the RIAU's 2nd artillery battalion.

In June 1919, after the unification of the Makhnovists with the green army of Nykyfor Hryhoriv, the council was reorganized into the Military Revolutionary Council of the rebel army, and Ivan was elected to the headquarters of the RIAU as head of the administrative unit.

He was killed by the White Guards on 20 August 1919 in the Novyi Buh area.

References

Bibliography

1889 births
1919 deaths
Ukrainian communists
Makhnovshchina
Russian people of World War I
People murdered in Ukraine
Ukrainian murder victims